BC VIČI-Aistės Kaunas was a Lithuanian women's basketball club based in Kaunas. Before ceasing operations due to financial difficulties, the team was the most titled women's basketball club in Lithuania.

History
The team, originally called "Kibirkštis" (transl. "Spark"), was founded in Vilnius in 1961 as homage to a nearby electrical welding equipment plant. Its first coach was Algis Gedminas, a no-nonsense disciplinarian who had previously taught at a Moldavian pedagogical institute. Under Gedminas's direction, Kibirkštis quickly became a powerhouse in the Soviet Lithuanian women's basketball league, winning back-to-back championships in the late 1960s and early 1970s, as well as several bronze medals in the top-tier Soviet basketball tournament. The team was led by women who represented Soviet Union national team in various European Championships and Olympic Tournaments, including Larisa Vinčaitė, Angelė Jankūnaitė-Rupšienė and Vida Šulskytė-Beselienė.

After Lithuania's restoration of independence, the team continued to dominate in the Lithuanian basketball championship, attracting local talent such as Aneta Kaušaitė and Jurgita Štreimikytė-Virbickienė (the first two Lithuanian players in the WNBA) and international talent alike. During this transitionary period, Kibirkštis's name changed to "Ryšininkas-Šviesa" in 1990, "Telerina" in 1992, "Lietuvos Telekomas" in 1995 and "TEO" in 2006. The team also established a subsidiary club "Lintel-118" around 2000, which tailored to youth development and competed in LMKL and LMKAL until its folding in 2006. One notable alumna is Gintarė Petronytė, a two-time EuroCup Women champion who started her career with "Lintel-118" in 2005.

Telekomas reached unprecedented heights in the 2004-05 and 2005-06 season, when, headed by Algirdas Paulauskas, the team won the LMKL, BWBL tournaments and reached the semifinal in the top-tier EuroLeague Women tournament. WNBA All-Star and Champion Katie Douglas, European Basketball Champion Jurgita Štreimikytė and two-time EuroLeague bronze medalist Sandra Linkevičienė formed this team’s core. 

In 2010, TEO relocated to Kaunas and was renamed "VIČI-Aistės". After two successful seasons, the team dissolved due to a lack of sponsorship.

Titles

Notable players
  Larisa Vinčaitė (1963–1973)
  Angelė Jankūnaitė-Rupšienė (1968–1984)
  Vida Šulskytė-Beselienė (1973–1988)
  Aneta Kaušaitė (1988–1993)
  Jurgita Štreimikytė-Virbickienė (1990–1993; 2004–2005; 2005–2010)
  Irena Baranauskaitė-Vizbarienė (1995–2007)
  Aušra Bimbaitė (2001–2009; 2010–2011)
  Eglė Šulčiūtė (2001–2003; 2004–2007)
  Gintarė Petronytė (2005–2009)
  Sandra Valužytė-Linkevičienė (1999–2008; 2011)
  Rima Vadapalaitė-Valentienė (1998–2009; 2010–2012)
  Ieva Kubliņa (2004–2006)
  Katie Douglas (2004–2007)
  Yelena Leuchanka (2006–2008)
  Milica Dabović (2007)
  Nykesha Sales (2007–2008)
  Crystal Langhorne (2008–2009)
  Lindsey Harding (2009–2010)
   Quanitra Hollingsworth (2010–2011)
  Chioma Nnamaka (2009–2010)

Head coaches
 Algis Gedminas (1961–1981)
 Valentinas Kanapkis (1981–1986)
 Heino Lill (1988–1989)
 Valentinas Kanapkis (1994–1997)
 Algirdas Budėnas (1998–2001)
 Algirdas Paulauskas (2001–2007)
 Rūtenis Paulauskas (2007–2009)
 Mantas Šernius (2010–2012)

References

Basketball teams in Lithuania
Women's sport in Lithuania